, son of regent Naozane, was a kugyō or Japanese court noble of the Edo period (1603–1868). He married Kyohime, a daughter of Tokugawa Munekatsu, eighth head of Owari Domain, and the couple had a son Sukeie.

References
 

1746 births
1770 deaths
Fujiwara clan
Kujō family